Matias H. Aznar Memorial College of Medicine, Inc. (MHAM CM, Inc.) is a medical school in Cebu City, Philippines. It was founded in 1947.

History 
Matias H. Aznar Memorial College of Medicine, Inc. (MHAM CM, Inc.) is a non-stock educational institution established by Don Matias Hipolito Aznar II and his wife Doña Anunciacion Barcenilla Aznar. In the school year 1946–1947, the Doctor of Medicine Program was opened with full government recognition granted by the Department of Education in 1952 and the enactment of the Medical Act of 1965 by the Philippine Congress requiring all medical colleges in the country to be converted into a non-profit and non-stock educational institution. Thus, the Doctor of Medicine Program was converted and registered with the Securities and Exchange Commission (SEC) on May 26, 1970, under the corporate name Matias H. Aznar Memorial College of Medicine, Inc. (MHAM CM, Inc.) and was given an institutional identifier number 7071 by the Commission of Higher Education (CHED). The school was named after its late founder, Matias Hipolito Aznar II, known to the general public as MHAM to honor and perpetuate his memory. The Doctor of Medicine is the only academic program offered by the school which operates separately from SWU PHINMA.

Soon to be permanently located at R. Duterte Street Banawa, Guadalupe, Cebu City, the Matias H. Aznar Memorial College of Medicine, Inc. fulfills the vision of its founder and is still committed to provide quality education with quality educators in the field of medicine both in the country and across the globe. The futuristic memorial building will also pave way for the school to open for paramedical courses for the academic year 2019–2020.

Campus 
MHAM is located in R. Duterte St., Sitio Banawa, Brgy. Guadalupe, Cebu City. The campus consists of a 10-storey main building, and a 6-storey annex building. Before locating in its current location, MHAM was temporarily located at Redemptorist Plaza, Brgy. Camputhaw, Cebu City.

Student organizations 
 MHAM Student Council
 Asklepian Circle
 Caduceus Rescue Unit (CRU)
 MHArMony
 MHAM Upbeat
 MHAM Acoustics  
 The Saline Option-MHAM CM
 Student Advocates for Public Health and Environment (SAPHE)

Publication 
 The Pulse - The official publication of Matias H. Aznar Memorial College of Medicine, Inc.
 MHAM College of Medicine Medical Research Journal

Affiliated hospitals
 Vicente Sotto Memorial Medical Center (VSMMC)- Base Hospital
 Perpetual Succour Hospital - Bishop Juan Bautista G. Gorordo Avenue, Cebu City
 Visayas Community Medical Center
 Chong Hua Hospital (CHH)
 Yanhee Hospital, Bangkok, Thailand

References

External links 
 MHAM College of Medicine
 List of APMC (Accredited Philippine Medical Schools).

Medical schools in the Philippines
1947 establishments in the Philippines
Universities and colleges in Cebu City